Blues is a single-disc compilation album by Bob Dylan, released on June 27, 2006, and distributed exclusively by Barnes & Noble. By November 2011 it also became available to members of the Jazz Heritage Society through their Review, Release # 564.

Track listing

References 

2006 compilation albums
Albums produced by Barry Beckett
Albums produced by Bob Dylan
Albums produced by Bob Johnston
Albums produced by Daniel Lanois
Albums produced by Jerry Wexler
Albums produced by Leon Russell
Albums produced by Mark Knopfler
Bob Dylan compilation albums
Columbia Records compilation albums